Folk is an unincorporated community in northwestern Osage County, Missouri, United States. It is located approximately ten miles southeast of Jefferson City.

It is on county road 505 one-quarter mile west of Route 133 and approximately five miles west of Westphalia. The Osage River flows past one mile west of the site.

A post office called Folk was established in 1905, and remained in operation until 1964. The community was named for former governor Joseph W. Folk.

References

Unincorporated communities in Osage County, Missouri
Jefferson City metropolitan area
Unincorporated communities in Missouri